Jean Parra (18 August 1938 – 25 July 2002) was a French boxer. He competed in the men's bantamweight event at the 1960 Summer Olympics. At the 1960 Summer Olympics, he lost to József Nagy of Hungary.

References

External links
 

1938 births
2002 deaths
French male boxers
Olympic boxers of France
Boxers at the 1960 Summer Olympics
Sportspeople from Lyon
Bantamweight boxers